Events from the year 1635 in Sweden

Incumbents
 Monarch – Christina

Events

 The ambassadorial mission of Axel Oxenstierna to Paris: alliance between Sweden and France. 
 September 12 – The Treaty of Sztumska Wieś is signed between Sweden and the Polish–Lithuanian Commonwealth.
 Truce of Altmark
 Johan Banér becomes the leader of the Swedish army.

Births

 February 18 – Johan Göransson Gyllenstierna, politician (died 1680)

Deaths

References

 
Years of the 17th century in Sweden
Sweden